Giovanni Maria Quaglio the Younger (1772–1813) was an Italian architect, painter, and stage designers active in Munich, member of the large Quaglio pedigree. He was born at Laino. He studied at Rome, Naples, Milan, and Venice, and became in 1793 court scene-painter at Munich. He was the son of Lorenzo Quaglio the Elder.

References

1772 births
1813 deaths
18th-century Italian painters
Italian male painters
19th-century Italian painters
German scenic designers
19th-century Italian male artists
18th-century Italian male artists